Anirban or Anirvan is an Indian masculine given name. It is mostly used in the Bengali and Assamese languages. The meaning of the Sanskrit word  is "the fire that never stops" or "unextinguished". Notable people with this name include:
 Anirvan (1896–1978), Hindu scholar
 Anirban Bhattacharya, Bengali actor
 Anirban Chatterjee (born 1982), Indian cricketer
 Anirvan Ghosh, American neuroscientist
 Anirban Lahiri (born 1987), Indian golfer
 Anirban Mukhopadhyay, marketing scholar

References 

Indian masculine given names